is a Japanese professional shogi player ranked 5-dan. Orita is the fourth amateur to obtain professional status without doing so via the Japan Shogi Association's apprentice professional school after he became the second player to pass the Professional Admission Test in February 2020. 

Orita is also popular shogi YouTuber whose channel "Age Age Shogi Commentary" has a little over 40 thousand subscribers and has had almost 23 million views since it was started in April 2016.

Promotion history
The promotion history for Orita is as follows.

4-dan: April 1, 2020
5-dan: October 6, 2022

References

External links
 ShogiHub: Professional Player Info · Orita, Shōgo
 

Living people
1989 births
Japanese shogi players
Professional shogi players
Professional shogi players from Osaka Prefecture
Shogi YouTubers
Japanese YouTubers